is one of the 16 wards of the city of Nagoya in Aichi Prefecture, Japan. As of 1 October 2019, the ward had an estimated population of 165,287 and a population density of 8,498 persons per km². The total area was 19.45 km².

Geography
Meitō Ward is located in eastern Nagoya city.

Surrounding municipalities
Moriyama Ward
Chikusa Ward
Tenpaku Ward
Nisshin
Nagakute

Towns and villages
 

Fujigaoka

History
The area of present Meitō-ku was formerly part of Aichi District and Higashikasugai District. Incorporated into the city of Nagoya by 1955 and divided between Chikusa Ward and Showa Ward,  it became a separate ward on February 1, 1975.

Education
Aichi Toho University

Transportation

Railroads
Aichi Rapid Transit Company - Linimo
 
Nagoya Municipal Subway – Higashiyama Line
  -  -  -

Highways
Tōmei Expressway
Nagoya Dai-ni Kanjo Expressway
Route 2 (Nagoya Expressway) 
Japan National Route 302 
Japan National Route 363

Noted people from Meitō-ku, Nagoya
Shibata Katsuie – Samurai during the Sengoku period
Mao Asada – professional figure skater
Mai Asada – professional figure skater, model, actress
Tetsuo Nakanishi – professional soccer player
Kayo Satoh – model, actress

References

External links
 / Official website 

Wards of Nagoya